Churi Wiqu (Aymara churi dull yellow, wiqu a corner in a house, a mountain cove, "dull yellow mountain cove", Hispanicized spelling Chorehueco) is a mountain in the Andes of southern Peru, about  high. It is situated on the border of the Moquegua Region, General Sánchez Cerro Province, Ichuña District, and the Puno Region, Puno Province, Pichacani District. It lies southeast of the mountains Tankani and Chuqipata.

Churi Wiqu is also the name of a river which originates near the mountain. It flows to the east.

References

Mountains of Moquegua Region
Mountains of Puno Region
Mountains of Peru